Television in Ethiopia was introduced in 1962 with the government owned ETV. Color television started in 1979 on an experiment basis with regular transmissions starting in 1984 to commemorate the founding of Workers' Party of Ethiopia (WPE). Ethiopia got its first private television broadcaster in 2008 with EBS TV, a US based satellite TV channel mostly focused on infotainment.

Until very recently there was only one private station with most of the stations being state owned. However, emphasis on liberalization of the TV market eventually led to a wave of privately owned stations coming about recent years. In 2014 the Oromo diaspora launched the one and only television; Oromia Media Network, based in US OMN. In 2016 and 2017, more private broadcasters such as the news centered ENN TV and others like LTV Ethiopia, Kana TV, EOTC TV all joined the market. Dimtsi Weyane and were launched at the end 2018. 7 million households in Ethiopia has at least one television set and about 55 percent of the population has access to the watch television in there homes.

History
The national public broadcaster EBC (formerly ERTA) started broadcasting in 1962 as the first television station in Ethiopia. In the last couple of the decades the broadcaster had opened multiple regional stations and channels broadcasting in various languages. Privatization of the television industry was a slow process with the first privately run broadcaster, EBS TV, launching in 2008. However, 2016 and 2017 saw a wave of private station entering the market including what became the most popular channel, Kana TV, to increase the total number of private station's in Ethiopia to 45.

In 2016 the government of Ethiopia announced it would be transition the country from analog to digital platform. The American company GatesAir won the contract for the project that will take 5–10 years to fully complete.

TV stations

Government-owned television stations

Digital cable services

Privately owned TV stations

Religious broadcasters

Weekly market share
Source: Kantar-Geopoll Media Measurement for Ethiopia (March 2017)

Top 10 programs (March 2017)

See also
Ethiopian Broadcasting Corporation
Media in Ethiopia
Culture of Ethiopia

References

1962 establishments in Ethiopia